The Galerucinae are a large subfamily of the leaf beetles (Chrysomelidae), containing about 15,000 species in more than 1000 genera, of which about 500 genera and about 8000 species make up the flea beetle tribe Alticini.

The division into tribes is more a matter of tradition than based on modern research. Some genera, for example Yingaresca, are better considered incertae sedis due to a general lack of knowledge. And while a good case can be made for some tribes – namely the Alticini and Galerucini – being all but monophyletic even in their traditional delimitation, others, such as Luperini, appear to be just paraphyletic assemblages of primitive and more basal genera.

Selected genera

 Acalymma
 Agelastica
 Aplosonyx
 Arima
 Asbecesta
 Aulacophora
 Belarima
 Calomicrus
 Cneorane
 Diorhabda
 Diabrotica
 Euluperus
 Exosoma
 Falsoexosoma
 Galeruca
 Galerucella
 Leptomona
 Lochmaea
 Longitarsus Latreille, 1829
 Luperus
 Marseulia
 Menippus Clark, 1864
 Monolepta
 Normaltica
 Nymphius
 Oides 
 Phyllobrotica
 Poneridia
 Psylliodes
 Pyrrhalta
 Sermylassa
 Theone
 Trirhabda
 Xanthogaleruca
 Yingaresca Bechyné, 1956

Fossil genera 

 †Taimyraltica Nadein, 2018 Taimyr amber, Russia, Santonian

See also
 List of Galerucinae genera (not including Alticini)
 List of flea beetle genera

References

Further reading

 Wilcox, J.A. (1971-1975). Chrysomelidae. Galerucinae. Coleopterorum Catalogus Supplementa 78: 1–770.
 
 
 

 
Beetle subfamilies
Articles containing video clips
Taxa named by Pierre André Latreille